This is a list of Liberal Democrat  Members of Parliament (MPs) elected to the House of Commons of the United Kingdom for the 55th Parliament of the UK (2010–2015). This specifies the 57 MPs elected at the 2010 general election.

MPs

See also
 List of MPs elected in the 2010 United Kingdom general election
 List of MPs for constituencies in England 2010–15
 List of MPs for constituencies in Northern Ireland 2010–15
 List of MPs for constituencies in Scotland 2010–15
 List of MPs for constituencies in Wales 2010–15
 List of United Kingdom Conservative MPs (2010–15)
 List of United Kingdom Liberal Democrat MPs (2015–17)
 Members of the House of Lords
 :Category:UK MPs 2010–2015

References

2010-15
Liberal Democrat